Liam O'Donovan (born 1998) is an Irish Gaelic footballer who plays for Cork Senior Championship club Clonakilty and at inter-county level with the Cork senior football team. He usually lines out as a right wing-back.

Playing career

Clonakilty Community College

O'Donovan first came to prominence as a Gaelic footballer with Clonakilty Community College. He played in every grade of Gaelic football before eventually joining the college's senior hurling team and lined out in several Corn Uí Mhuirí campaigns.

University College Cork

As a student at University College Cork, O'Donovan joined the senior football team during his second year. On 20 February 2019, he was an unused substitute when UCC defeated St Mary's University College by 0-16 to 1-09 to win the Sigerson Cup.

Clonakilty

O'Donovan joined the Clonakilty club when at a young age and played in all grades at juvenile and underage levels. On 5 October 2015, he was at left wing-back when Clonakilty defeated Bantry Blues by 3-13 to 0-08 to win the Premier 2 Minor Championship for the second time in three seasons.

On 7 May 2016, O'Donovan made his first appearance for the Clonakilty senior team. He lined out at centre-back in a 0-13 to 0-14 defeat by Castlehaven in the Cork Senior Championship.

Cork

Minor and under-20

O'Donovan first lined out for Cork as a member of the minor team during the 2016 Munster Championship. He was appointed vice-captain for the year and made his first appearance for the team on 13 April 2016 when he lined out at left corner-back in a 1-14 to 1-11 defeat of Tipperary. O'Donovan retained his position at left corner-back when Cork suffered a 3-14 to 3-08 defeat by Kerry in the Munster final on 3 July 2016.

O'Donovan was drafted onto the Cork under-21 team for the 2017 Munster Championship. He made his first appearance for the team on 15 March 2017 when he came on as a half-time substitute for Maidhcí Ó Duinnín in a 2-10 to 0-10 defeat of Limerick. On 29 March 2017, O'Donovan was selected on the bench but was a late inclusion at left wing-forward when Cork suffered a 2-16 to 0-06 defeat by Kerry in the Munster final.

O'Donovan was appointed captain of the Cork under-20 team for the 2018 Munster Championship. He lined out at left corner-back when Cork were defeated by Kerry by 3-11 to 0-14 in the Munster final on 29 June 2018.

Senior

O'Donovan was added to the Cork senior team in advance of the 2019 season. He made his first appearance for the team on 12 January 2019 when he lined out at left wing-back in a 1-09 to 0-09 defeat by Clare in the McGrath Cup final. O'Donovan made his first appearance in the National League on 27 January 2019 when he came on as a 56th-minute substitute for James Loughrey in a 1-05 to 0-08 draw with Fermanagh. On 22 June 2019, he was at left win-back when Cork suffered a 1-19 to 3-10 defeat by Kerry in the Munster final.

On 9 July 2020, it was confirmed that O'Donovan would miss the rest of the club and inter-county season after suffering a cruciate ligament tear in a club challenge the previous weekend.

Honours

University College Cork
Sigerson Cup (1): 2019

Clonakilty
Cork Premier 2 Minor Football Championship (1): 2015

Career statistics

Club

Inter-county

References

1998 births
Living people
UCC Gaelic footballers
Clonakilty Gaelic footballers
Clonakilty hurlers
Cork inter-county Gaelic footballers